The year 2011 in art involved some significant events and new works.

Events
February 28 – Museo Soumaya in Mexico City, designed by Fernando Romero, is officially opened.
April 3 – The Chinese artist and dissident Ai Weiwei is arrested and detained and his studio sealed off, by the government of the People's Republic of China, during an apparent crackdown by the regime on activists and dissidents. The government later states that Weiwei is being held while investigated for economic crimes.
April 16 – Turner Contemporary art gallery, designed by David Chipperfield, opens in Margate, Kent, England.
May 1 – UK publication of @earth.
May 21 – The Hepworth Wakefield art gallery, designed by David Chipperfield, opens to the public in West Yorkshire, England.
June – Mougins Museum of Classical Art opens in France.
June 22 – The Chinese legal authorities release Ai Weiwei on bail after three months' detention, after being charged for alleged tax evasion. His incarceration is widely viewed as an attempt to silence a prominent critic while authorities had time to decide on legal grounds for prosecuting him, and his detention prompts worldwide condemnation of the Chinese government. According to the China's Foreign Ministry, he is prohibited from leaving Beijing without permission for one year. After his release Weiwei declines to give interviews saying that he is not allowed to talk.
 September – firstsite's new art gallery, designed by Rafael Viñoly, opens in Colchester, England.
September 8 – Release of Gerhard Richter – Painting, a documentary about the German artist, written and directed by Corinna Belz.
September & October – 2011 Montreal Museum of Fine Arts thefts. In two separate incidents, antique stone pieces are taken from the museum. One was recovered two years later in Edmonton; the other remains missing.
October 28 – ArcelorMittal Orbit, designed by Anish Kapoor, erected at Olympic Park, London.
November 8 – Rhein II by the German photographer Andreas Gursky sells for US$4.3m (£2.7m) at Christie's, New York becoming the most expensive photograph ever sold.
November 15 – Ai Weiwei pays 8.45 million yuan in taxes after receiving a large number of donations from supporters who believe the debt was politically motivated because of his criticism of the Chinese government.
November 28 – The Knoedler art dealership in New York City announces its permanent closure amid revelations that it had been dealing in forged paintings.

Exhibitions
February 24 – June 5 – Thomas Lawrence: "Regency Power and Brilliance", Yale Center for British Art, New Haven, Connecticut
April 12 – September 11 – "The Luminous Interval: The Dimitris Daskalopoulos Collection at the Guggenheim Bilbao
April 14 – July 15 – "Picasso and Marie-Thérèse: L’amour Fou", curated by John Richardson and Diana Widmaier Picasso, at the Gagosian Gallery, 522 West 21st Street in New York City
May 4 – August 7 – Alexander McQueen: Savage Beauty Metropolitan Museum of Art in New York City
June 4 – November 27 – Julian Schnabel: "Permanently Becoming and the Architecture of Seeing" curated by Norman Rosenthal, Museo Correr, Venice, Italy
June 29 – September 25 – "Twombly – Poussin, Arcadian Painters"at the Dulwich Picture Gallery in London
September 18 (to January 9, 2012) – "de Kooning: A Retrospective", Museum of Modern Art, New York,
November 9 (to February 5, 2012) – "Leonardo da Vinci, Painter at the Court of Milan", National Gallery, London

Works

Douwe Blumberg - "America's Response Monument (De Oppresso Liber)" installed at Liberty Park, World Trade Center in New York City (conceived and executed small scale 2003 - cast and dedicated as a monumental sculpture 2011)
Maurizio Cattelan
L.O.V.E. (sculpture)
Turisti (installation, second version)
Isaac Cordal - Politicians Discussing Global Warming  (sculpture - Berlin)
Martin Creed – Work No 1059: Scotsman Steps (Edinburgh)
Tracey Emin – Love Is What You Want
Floc'h – Déjeuner sur l'herbe revisited
Lee Kelly – Moontrap, Oregon City, Oregon
Lei Yixin – Statue of Martin Luther King Jr. at the Martin Luther King Jr. Memorial in Washington, D.C.
Mark Patterson – Surfing Madonna (Encinitas, California)
John Howard Sanden – President George W. Bush
Lorna Simpson – Momentum (video)
Valentina Stefanovska – Warrior on a Horse (Skopje)
The Red Popsicle, Seattle

Films
 The Mill and the Cross

Awards

Archibald Prize – Ben Quilty for "Margaret Olley"
Venice Biennale (June 4 – November 27)
The Lion d'or (Golden Lion) for best national pavilion-Germany exhibiting the work of Christoph Schlingensief
The Lion d'or for lifetime achievement – Franz West and Sturtevant
The Lion d'or for best artwork in the main exhibition – Christian Marclay
The Silver Lion for most promising new artist – Haroon Mirza

Deaths
January 4 – B. H. Friedman, 84, writer, author of the first biography on Jackson Pollock
January 5 – Malangatana Ngwenya, 74, Mozambican painter and poet
January 9 – Makinti Napanangka, 80s, indigenous Australian Papunya Tula artist
January 11 – Won-il Rhee, 50, South Korean digital art curator
January 13 – Ellen Stewart, 91, founder of La MaMa E.T.C., New York, designer
January 20 – Alan Uglow, 69, British born American painter
January 21 – Dennis Oppenheim, 72, American sculptor
February 4 - Françoise Cachin, 74, French art, historian, and museum director (Musée d'Orsay)
February 8 – Charles O. Perry, 81, American sculptor
February 11 – Roy Gussow, 92, American sculptor
February 25 – Suze Rotolo, 67, American book artist
March 10 – Gabriel Laderman, 81, American painter
March 13 – Leo Steinberg, 90, American art historian and critic
March 27 – George Tooker, 90, American painter
March 30 – Jorge Camacho, 77, Cuban painter
April 8
John McCracken, 76, American sculptor and painter
Hedda Sterne, 100, Romanian born American painter
April 12 – Miroslav Tichý, 84, Czech photographer
May 13 – Stephen De Staebler, 79, American sculptor and printmaker
May 18 – Wlodzimierz Ksiazek, 60, Polish born American painter (body found on this date) 
May 25 – Leonora Carrington, 94, British born surrealist painter, resident in Mexico
June 4 – Claudio Bravo, 74, Chilean painter
June 9 – M. F. Husain, 95, Indian painter
June 11 – Jack Smith, 82, British painter
June 16 – Twins Seven Seven, 67, Nigerian painter and sculptor
June 20 – Thomas N. Armstrong III, 78, American curator and museum director (Whitney Museum of American Art and the Andy Warhol Museum)
June 22 – Robert Miller, 72, American gallerist
July 5 – Cy Twombly, 83, American painter
July 17 – Alex Steinweiss, 94, American graphic designer, inventor of the album cover
July 20 – Lucian Freud, 88, British painter
July 31 – John Hoyland, 76, British painter
August 4 – Éamonn O'Doherty, 72, Irish sculptor
August 6 – Roman Opałka, 79, French-born Polish painter
August 21 – Budd Hopkins, 80, American painter
August 23 – Jeanette Ingberman, 59, American curator, co-founder of Exit Art
September 5 – Vann Nath, 66, Cambodian painter
September 13 – Richard Hamilton, 89, British painter
September 16 – Stephen Mueller, 63, American painter
September 22 – Knut Steen, 86, Norwegian-born sculptor
October 24 – Bruno Weber, 80, Swiss artist and architect
November 13 – Pat Passlof, 83, American painter
November 23 – Gerald Laing, 75, British painter and sculptor
November 26 – Manon Cleary, 69, American painter
December 8 – Jerry Robinson, 89, American comic book artist and reputed creator of the Joker
December 21 – John Chamberlain, 84, American sculptor
December 26 – James Rizzi, 61, American pop artist
December 27 – Helen Frankenthaler, 83, American painter
December 30
Ronald Searle, 91, English cartoonist
Eva Zeisel, 105, Hungarian-born American ceramic artist and designer

References

 
 
2010s in art
Years of the 21st century in art